The Challenge Cup was an international competition for football clubs of the Austro-Hungarian Empire that ran from 1897 to 1911.

History

It was invented in 1897 in Vienna by John Gramlick, who was one of the founders of Vienna Cricket and Football-Club. The competition was open for all clubs in the Austro-Hungarian Empire, but practically all the participating teams came from the three major cities Vienna, Budapest and Prague. It was played in a knockout format.

The trophy was to be kept by the first team to win it in three consecutive seasons. In 1903 the rule was changed and the trophy is now in the possession of its last winner Wiener Sport-Club. The Challenge Cup was ceased in 1911. Today it is seen as the predecessor to the Austrian Cup (first held in 1918) and the Mitropa Cup, established in 1927.

Champions

List of finals

Titles by club

Titles by country

See also
Austrian Cup
Mitropa Cup
Balkans Cup
Latin Cup
European Railways Cup

References

Defunct international club association football competitions in Europe
Austrian football friendly trophies
Czech football friendly trophies
Hungarian football friendly trophies
Recurring sporting events established in 1897
Football in Austria-Hungary
1897 establishments in Austria-Hungary